Antonio Bokanovic (born 11 June 2003) is an Austrian footballer who plays as a defender for Dornbirner SV.

Career statistics

Club

Notes

References

2003 births
Living people
Austrian footballers
Association football defenders
FC Dornbirn 1913 players
2. Liga (Austria) players
Austrian Landesliga players